Crassispira flavocincta is a species of sea snail, a marine gastropod mollusk in the family Pseudomelatomidae.

Description
The length of the shell attains 6.6 mm, its diameter 2.6 mm.

Distribution
This marine species occurs in the Caribbean Sea off Jamaica, the ABC Islands and Panama.

References

 Adams, C. B. 1850. Description of supposed new species of marine shells which inhabit Jamaica. Contributions to Conchology, 4: 56-68, 109-123

External links
 
 
 De Jong K.M. & Coomans H.E. (1988) Marine gastropods from Curaçao, Aruba and Bonaire. Leiden: E.J. Brill. 261 pp. 

flavocincta
Gastropods described in 1850